Murina is a genus of vesper bats. They are found throughout temperate and tropical regions of Asia.

Taxonomy 
Species list based on American Society of Mammalogists and ITIS:
 Murina aenea - bronze tube-nosed bat
 Murina annamitica - Annam tube-nosed bat
 Murina aurata - little tube-nosed bat
 Murina balaensis - Bala tube-nosed bat
 Murina beelzebub - Beelzebub's tube-nosed bat
 Murina bicolor - bicolored tube-nosed bat
 Murina chrysochaetes - golden-haired tube-nosed bat
 Murina cineracea - ashy-gray tube-nosed bat
 Murina cyclotis - round-eared tube-nosed bat
 Murina eleryi - Elery's tube-nosed bat
 Murina fanjingshanensis  (He, Xiao & Zhou, 2016) - Fang He tube-nosed bat
 Murina feae - Fea's tube-nosed bat
 Murina fionae - Fiona's tube-nosed bat
 Murina florium - flute-nosed bat
 Murina florium florium
 Murina florium lanosa
 Murina florium toxopei
 Murina fusca - dusky tube-nosed bat
 Murina gracilis - slender tube-nosed bat
 Murina guilleni - Guillen's tube-nosed bat
 Murina harpioloides - Da Lat tube-nosed bat
 Murina harrisoni - Harrison's tube-nosed bat
 Murina hilgendorfi - Hilgendorf's tube-nosed bat
 Murina hkakaboraziensis - Hkakabo Razi tube-nosed bat
 Murina huttoni - Hutton's tube-nosed bat
 Murina huttoni huttoni
 Murina huttoni rubella
 Murina jaintiana - Jaintia tube-nosed bat
 Murina jinchui - Jinchu's tube-nosed bat
 Murina kontumensis (Son, Csorba, Tu, & Motokawa, 2015) - Kon Tum tube-nosd bat
 Murina leucogaster - greater tube-nosed bat
 Murina leucogaster leucogaster
 Murina leucogaster rubex
 Murina liboensis - Libo tube-nosed bat
 Murina loreliae - Lorelie's tube-nosed bat
 Murina peninsularis - peninsular tube-nosed bat
 Murina pluvialis - rainforest tube-nosed bat
 Murina puta - Taiwan tube-nosed bat
 Murina recondita - hidden tube-nosed bat
 Murina rongjiangensis - Rongjiang tube-nosed bat
 Murina rozendaali - gilded tube-nosed bat
 Murina ryukyuana - Ryukyu tube-nosed bat
 Murina shuipuensis - Shuipu tube-nosed bat
 Murina suilla - Brown tube-nosed bat
 Murina suilla suilla
 Murina suilla canescens
 Murina tenebrosa - gloomy tube-nosed bat
 Murina tiensa
 Murina tubinaris - Scully's tube-nosed bat
 Murina ussuriensis - Ussuri tube-nosed bat
 Murina walstoni - Walston's tube-nosed bat

References 
Notes

Sources

 Kuo, H.-C.; Fang, Y.-P.; Csorba G. & Lee, L.-L. 2009. Three New Species of Murina (Chiroptera: Vespertilionidae) from Taiwan. Journal of Mammalogy 90 (4): 980–991.
 Furey, N.M.; Thong, V.D.; Bates, P.J.J.; Csorba, G. (2009). Description of a new species belonging to the Murina 'suilla-group' (Chiroptera: Vespertilionidae: Murininae) from north Vietnam. Acta Chiropterologica 11 (2): 225–236.

Murininae
Bat genera
Taxa named by John Edward Gray